Hüseynova, also anglicised Huseynova, is an Azerbaijani surname. Notable people with this surname include:

 Elmira Hüseynova (1933-1995), Azerbaijani sculptor
 Hijran Huseynova (born 1955), Azerbaijani politician
 Vafa Huseynova (born 1988), Azerbaijani gymnast
 Zulfiyya Huseynova (born 1970), Azerbaijani judoka